This is a list of Spanish football transfers for the January sale in the 2008–09 season of La Liga and Segunda División. Only moves from La Liga and Segunda División are listed.

The winter transfer window opened on 1 January 2009, although a few transfers took place prior to that date. The window closed at midnight on 31 January 2009. Players without a club could have joined one at any time, either during or in between transfer windows. Clubs below La Liga level could also have signed players on loan at any time. If need be, clubs could have signed a goalkeeper on an emergency loan, if all others were unavailable.

Winter 2008–09 transfer window

References

See also
List of Spanish football transfers summer 2008

trans
Spanish
2008-09